Abraham Wagener House is a historic house located at Jerusalem in Yates County, New York. This Greek Revival style structure was built about 1833 and features a monumental proportioned temple portico with full pediment and wide entablature supported by massive two-story columns.

It was listed on the National Register of Historic Places in 1994.

References

Houses on the National Register of Historic Places in New York (state)
Greek Revival houses in New York (state)
Houses completed in 1833
Houses in Yates County, New York
National Register of Historic Places in Yates County, New York